Ixia paniculata is a plant species in the family Iridaceae.

References

paniculata